2,3-Dichlorophenylpiperazine is a chemical compound.

DCPP may also refer to:
 Disease Control Priorities Project, a joint enterprise
 Diablo Canyon Power Plant, a nuclear power plant in California
 Division of Child Protection and Permanency, the New Jersey child protection agency
 Direzione Centrale della Polizia di Prevenzione, the Italian national Central Police Directorate for Crime Prevention; see Divisione Investigazioni Generali e Operazioni Speciali